Gülbahçe is a village in the Urla district of Izmir Province, Turkey. Due to its location on the Gulf of Gerence and near the İzmir Institute of Technology, the village is greatly expanding. The old village is surrounded by vacation homes for people living in Izmir. The old route of the D.505 passes through the village and connects to the D.300 just south of the village. As of 2000, the population of Gülbahçe was 2,466.

References

Villages in Urla District
Populated coastal places in Turkey